Stelian Stancu (born 22 September 1981) is a Romanian former footballer who played as a right back or right midfielder for teams such as Sportul Studențesc, Steaua București, FC Timișoara, Khazar Lankaran or Academica Clinceni, among others.

Club career
Stancu made his debut playing for Astra Ploiești in 2000, before being loaned to Metalul Plopeni and joining the squad of Sportul Studențesc of Bucharest in 2002. After Sportul was relegated, he joined Steaua București on 31 August 2006, where he appeared in 17 league matches. He transferred to FC Timișoara in the summer break of 2007 for a reported fee of €200,000.
The first goal for FC Timișoara was against FC Argeș on 28 February 2009.

Honours
Sportul Studențesc
Liga II: Winner (1) 2003–04

Khazar Lankaran
Azerbaijan Cup: Winner (1) 2010–11

External links
 
 

1981 births
Living people
People from Tecuci
Romanian footballers
Association football defenders
Liga I players
Liga II players
FC Astra Giurgiu players
CSO Plopeni players
FC Sportul Studențesc București players
FC Steaua București players
FC Politehnica Timișoara players
FC Brașov (1936) players
Azerbaijan Premier League players
Khazar Lankaran FK players
ASA 2013 Târgu Mureș players
LPS HD Clinceni players
Romanian expatriate footballers
Expatriate footballers in Azerbaijan
Romanian expatriate sportspeople in Azerbaijan
Expatriate footballers in Spain
Romanian expatriate sportspeople in Spain